Cotoneaster adpressus, commonly known as creeping cotoneaster, is a species of flowering plant in the genus Cotoneaster of the family Rosaceae, native to western China. It has masses of tiny rounded leaves, with white flowers followed by bright scarlet berries. It is cultivated as groundcover in gardens in temperate regions.

This plant has gained the Royal Horticultural Society's Award of Garden Merit.

References

External links
Cotoneaster adpressus

adpressus
Flora of China